How We Do is the fifth album by hip hop duo Das EFX, released in 2003. Unlike the group's four previous albums, there was no production input from EPMD. Instead, the majority of the album's production was handled by group member Willie Hines.

Track listing

References

2003 albums
Das EFX albums
Albums produced by Dame Grease